Peet Montzingo is a Los Angeles based American internet personality, musician and writer. He is known best for his YouTube and TikTok videos showcasing a variety of content, which includes his family, all of whom have dwarfism.

Biography & career

Peet has 24 million followers across his social media platforms. His YouTube channel was ranked 17th among Top 50 Most Viewed U.S. YouTube Channels by Tubefilter. His videos show what it's like to be a tall person raised by a dwarf mother, besides serious videos tackling mental health awareness and fascination with the supernatural, as he lives across Cecil Hotel, which has been a subject of numerous incidents of deaths and violence, he records and shares his experience on TikTok.

In 2019, as a recording artist with the band 5WEST, he toured South Africa, Spain, and Europe, they did their first arena tour as the supporting act for Boyzone autumn of 2019.

In 2022, Peet co-authored a picture book titled Little Imperfections: A Tall Tale of Growing Up Different, along with Rockwell Sands. The book covers the theme of being different, it is told through the perspective of Peet himself.

Selected work

Bibliography 
 Little Imperfections (ISBN 9798986283609)

References

External links
Peet Montzingo @ IMDb

Living people

Year of birth missing (living people)
American YouTubers